The Bohus Line is a  long railway line from Gothenburg via Uddevalla and Munkedal to Strömstad. Bohus Line has seventeen stations; Strömstad, Skee, Överby, Tanum, Rabbalshede, Hällevadsholm, Dingle, Munkedal, Uddevalla C, Uddevalla Östra, Ljungskile, Svenshögen, Stenungsund, Stora Höga, Kode, Ytterby and Göteborg.

The Bohus Line connects to the Lysekil Line in Munkedal and the Älvsborg Line in Uddevalla and the Western Main Line among others in Gothenburg.

See also

Rail transport in Sweden

References

External links
}

Railway lines in Sweden